Loguin is a village in the Yaba Department of Nayala Province, Burkina Faso. The village has a population of 305.

References

Populated places in the Boucle du Mouhoun Region
Nayala Province